Willem Ravelli  (31 May 1892 – 21 September 1980) was a Dutch classical bass-baritone and an academic voice teacher. After a short operatic career with De Nederlandse Opera, he worked mostly in concert, singing Lieder and oratorios. He is known for as the voice of Christ in Bach's St Matthew Passion, which he performed more than 400 times, including the first recording of the work.

Career 
Born Willem Albert Felix Ravelli in The Hague, Ravelli studied voice with Frans Andreolie and Cornélie van Zanten, then at the conservatory in his home town in the opera class of Anton Sistermans.

Ravelli was a member of the De Nederlandse Opera in Amsterdam from the 1922/23 season. He appeared in many supporting roles, such as Morales in Bizet's Carmen and Alcindor in Puccini's La bohème, and in 1927 as Wolfram in Wagner's Tannhäuser.

He focused on concert singing, succeeding Thomas Denijs as the vox Christi in the regular performances of Bach's St. Matthew Passion conducted by Willem Mengelberg. A reviewer of a reissue of the performance which was shortened as customary at the time of the recording, notes in 2004: "As Jesus the Dutch bass Willem Ravelli can be a mite gruff but he's also a spiritually intense presence and right inside the role, one incidentally he performed over four hundred times."

Ravelli also appeared in Belgium, England and Germany, presenting a broad repertory including the bass part in Beethoven's Ninth Symphony. He recorded the symphony in 1940, again with Mengelberg, the Toonkunstkoor and the Concertgebouw Orchestra, and the Royal Oratorio Society.

Ravelli was a voice teacher at the Rotterdam Conservatory from 1937, and at the conservatory in The Hague from 1945. He died in Laren.

References

External links 
 Willem Ravelli (Bass) Bach Cantatas Website
 

Dutch bass-baritones
1892 births
1980 deaths
Musicians from The Hague
20th-century Dutch male opera singers